Donna S. Dewberry (born November 6, 1953) is an American artist and author who is a member of the Church of Jesus Christ of Latter-day Saints. She developed a "One Stroke" painting technique that will enable anyone to reproduce any effect of nature with one easy-to-learn technique.

Personal
Dewberry is a member of the Church of Jesus Christ of Latter-day Saints.

Television
She had a public television show, One Stroke Painting with Donna Dewberry. In 2007, One Stroke Painting was replaced with The Donna Dewberry Show.

One Stroke Technique
The "One Stroke Technique" is a double loading technique that consists of loading a brush with two separate colors.  Dewberry claims that with her technique you are able to achieve the shading and highlighting in one stroke .

As a side note, from the Archival records and articles in the UK, it is known that the Schools of Art of the time (1700s) took apprentices and trained them, in either the 'one-stroke' style required for decorating furniture, or the 'one-stroke' style required for decorating pottery. (Those not able to afford the School of Art costs, spent years learning from the Master Painter within a firm).  The brushes (paint brushes are called pencils in the Pottery trade) were 'double' and 'triple' loaded, to produce the highlight, body colour and shadow, of the petal, leaf or element, painted wet-on-wet and with a single stroke of the brush. This quick method of painting was used for commercial reasons - to speedily decorate the furniture, pottery and trays ready for sale.
So, although the brush carried one, two, three or more colours, it would have taken only 'one stroke' of the brush to produce the more complicated shading, giving depth and beauty to the design. It would have taken much longer to blend these colours together had they been added separately.

A more modern example of the double loading technique is from The Joy of Painting featuring Bob Ross, who would double load his brush during the show to make the wet on wet technique easier and to make the painting look more natural.

As such, it can be assumed that Donna Dewberry did not invent this style.

However, originally autographed paintings by Donna Dewberry are difficult to find for purchase privately.

Writing
She was a columnist for magazines including Tole World, Painting magazine and Decorative Artists Workbook.

Books 
 Amazing Metallics
 Basic Strokes Workbook
 Clay Pots
 Decorative Furniture with Donna Dewberry
 Decorative Murals with Donna Dewberry
 Donna Dewberry's Complete Book of One-Stroke Painting
 Donna Dewberry's One Stroke Painting Course	
 Flowers A to Z with Donna Dewberry
 FolkArt  One Stroke Books - Beautiful Backgrounds
 One Stroke A Season of Glass
 One Stroke Bake-able Glass
 One Stroke Cigar Box Purses
 One Stroke Country Bugs
 One Stroke Donna's Favorites
 One Stroke Floral Bouquets
 Quick & Easy Murals
 Peaceful Landscapes
 Landscapes
 Cards and Greetings
 Painted Celebrations
 Season Delights
 Painted Glass and Ceramics
 Fountains and Birdbaths
 Garden Animals
 Small and Pretty
 Outdoor Decor
 Donna's Favorites
 One Stroke Nudes
 Paper Pleasure
 I Believe in Angels
 Lifestyle: A Summer Garden
 Landscapes for the Home (HD)

References

External links 
 Donna Dewberry's Official One Stroke Web Site

1953 births
American Latter Day Saints
American artists
Living people